Pet Show! is a 1972 children's picture book by American author and illustrator Ezra Jack Keats. In an animated movie by Weston Woods Studios, Inc. in 1992, Terry Alexander narrated the movie with music by Fred Weinberg and Joe Beck.

Plot
Archie wants to enter his cat in the neighborhood pet show—but where is the cat? Archie keeps on looking even after all the other kids have given up, but his pet is nowhere to be found. Ingenious Archie has a plan to enter the contest—with a most surprising creature and enters an empty jar which he says contains a germ whom he named Al.

Reception
Publishers Weekly stated that Pet Show! '...captures a smalltown simplicity amidst an urban landscape...' while a Kirkus Reviews review spoke of the author's '... brightly patterned collage, exuberant thick-smudged paint, and general good will...'.

References

1972 children's books
American children's books
American picture books
Books about cats
Books by Ezra Jack Keats
Sequel books